This list of electoral wards in Cardiff includes electoral wards in the city and county of Cardiff, Wales. It also includes Community Council wards. There were further ward changes effective from the May 2022 Cardiff Council election, as a result of a 2020 boundary review.

Current county wards
The unitary authority area is divided into 28 electoral wards. Many of these wards are coterminous with communities of the same name. The following table lists council wards, communities and associated geographical areas. Communities with a community council are indicated with an asterisk.

Ward changes 2022
In October 2021 Cardiff Council accepted a large number ward change proposals of the Local Democracy and Boundary Commission for Wales, with only slight modification. These were to take effect from the 2022 council election.

Twenty-one wards were to remain unchanged: Adamsdown, Caerau, Canton, Cathays, Cyncoed, Ely, Fairwater, Gabalfa, Heath, Llandaff, Llandaff North, Llanrumney, Penylan, Plasnewydd, Pontprennau/Old St Mellons (but renamed "Pontprennau and Old St Mellons"), Rhiwbina, Riverside, Rumney, Splott, Trowbridge, Whitchurch and Tongwynlais.

Of the other wards:
 Butetown (electoral ward) would have an increase from 1 to 3 councillors.
 Creigiau/St Fagans would be merged with the Pentyrch ward and renamed "Pentyrch and St Fagans", with a total increase in councillors from 2 to 3.
 Grangetown would have an increase from 3 to 4 councillors.
 Lisvane to be renamed "Lisvane and Thornhill" with the addition of Thornhill from the neighbouring Llanishen ward and an increase from 1 to 3 councillors.
 Llanishen would see a decrease in councillors, from 4 to 2, following the transfer of Thornhill to Lisvane.
 Pentwyn would see a decrease in councillors, from 4 to 3.
 Radyr would have an increase from 1 to 2 councillors.

County wards 1995 to 2022
 

The post-1996 unitary authority of the City and County of Cardiff has since 1999 been divided into 29 electoral wards returning 75 councillors to Cardiff Council. Many of these wards are coterminous with communities (civil parishes) of the same name.  The following table lists council wards, numbers of councillors, associated communities and geographical areas:

* = Community which elects a community council
c = County ward coterminous with community of the same name

1995
Prior to the 1999 election, Lisvane and (Old) St Mellons were combined in a "Lisvane and St Mellons" ward, returning 1 councillor. Radyr was combined with St Fagans in a "Radyr and St Fagans" ward, returning 1 councillor. Creigiau returned its own councillor.

Community wards
The communities of Lisvane, Pentyrch and Creigiau, Radyr and St Fagans elect their own community councils.

 Lisvane Community Council comprises 10 community councillors elected from the community ward of Lisvane.
 Pentyrch Community Council comprises 13 community councillors elected from the community wards of Creigiau, Gwaelod-y-Garth and Pentyrch.
 Radyr and Morganstown Community Council comprises 11 community councillors elected from the community wards of Morganstown, Radyr North and Radyr South.
 St Fagans Community Council comprises 9 community councillors elected from the community ward of St Fagans.

1890

Following the creation of Cardiff County Borough Council in 1889, in 1890 the number of electoral wards was increased from 5 to 10. Each ward was represented by 3 councillors.
 Adamsdown
 Canton
 Cathays
 Central
 Grangetown
 Park
 Riverside
 Roath
 South
 Splott

See also
 List of electoral wards in Wales

References

Cardiff